Kushk Rural District may refer to:
 Kushk Rural District (Khuzestan Province)
 Kushk Rural District (Bafq County), Yazd province